The Diderot effect is a social phenomenon related to consumer goods. It is based on two ideas. The first idea is that goods purchased by consumers will align with their sense of identity, and, as a result, will complement one another. The second idea states that the introduction of a new possession that deviates from the consumer's current complementary goods can result in a process of spiraling consumption. The term was coined by anthropologist and scholar of consumption patterns Grant McCracken in 1988, and is named after the French philosopher Denis Diderot (1713–1784), who first described the effect in an essay.

The term has become common in discussions of sustainable consumption and green consumerism, in regard to the process whereby a purchase or gift creates dissatisfaction with existing possessions and environment, provoking a potentially spiraling pattern of consumption with negative environmental, psychological, and social impacts.

Origin

The effect was first described in Diderot's essay "Regrets on Parting with My Old Dressing Gown". Here he tells how the gift of a beautiful scarlet dressing gown leads to unexpected results, eventually plunging him into debt. Initially pleased with the gift, Diderot came to rue his new garment. Compared to his elegant new dressing gown, the rest of his possessions began to seem tawdry and he became dissatisfied that they did not live up to the elegance and style of his new possession. He replaced his old straw chair, for example, with an armchair covered in Moroccan leather; his old desk was replaced with an expensive new writing table; his formerly beloved prints were replaced with more costly prints, and so on. "I was absolute master of my old dressing gown", Diderot writes, "but I have become a slave to my new one … Beware of the contamination of sudden wealth. The poor man may take his ease without thinking of appearances, but the rich man is always under a strain".

Usage
In McCracken's usage the Diderot effect is the result of the interaction between objects within "product complements", or "Diderot unities", and consumers. A Diderot unity is a group of objects that are considered to be culturally complementary, in relation to one another. McCracken describes that a consumer is less likely to veer from a preferred Diderot unity in order to strive towards unity in appearance and representation of one's social role. However, it can also mean that if an object that is somehow deviant from the preferred Diderot unity is acquired, it may have the effect of causing the consumer to start subscribing to a completely different Diderot unity.

Sociologist and economist Juliet Schor uses the term in her best selling 1992 book The Overspent American: Why We Want What We Don't Need to describe processes of competitive, status-conscious consumption driven by dissatisfaction. Schor's 2005 essay "Learning Diderot’s Lesson: Stopping the Upward Creep of Desire" describes the effect in contemporary consumer culture in the context of its negative environmental consequences.

References
McCracken, Grant Culture and Consumption: New Approaches to the Symbolic Character of Consumer Goods and Activities. Indiana University Press, Bloomington and Indianapolis, 1988 ; pp. 118–129
 Schor, Juliet B. "The Overspent American: Why We Want What We Don't Need" Harper Perennial; 1st HarperPerennial Ed Pub. 1999 edition.  
 Schor, Juliet B. ‘Learning Diderot’s Lesson: Stopping the Upward Creep of Desire,’ in Tim Jackson (ed), Sustainable Consumption (2005)

Further reading

 English translation of Regrets on My Old Dressing Gown https://www.marxists.org/reference/archive/diderot/1769/regrets.htm
 'Diderot Effect’Evans, D, in: P. Robbins, J. Mansvelt and G.Golson, editor(s). "Encyclopaedia of Green Consumerism". Sage; 2010.
Pantzar, Mika "Domestication of Everyday Life Technology: Dynamic Views on the Social Histories of Artifacts" in Design Issues, Vol. 13, No. 3 (Autumn, 1997), pp. 52–65

External links
Culture By Grant McCracken's blog
Juliet Schor's Blog
The Diderot Effect - Why Do We Keep Buying Stuff We Don’t Need?

Anthropology
Consumer behaviour